Masdevallia rolfeana is a species of orchid endemic to Costa Rica.

It is in the Epidendreae family, the reed orchids.

References

External links 

rolfeana
Endemic orchids of Costa Rica